Integrator complex subunit 12 (Int12) also known as PHD finger protein 22 (PHF22) is a protein that in humans is encoded by the INTS12 gene.

INTS12 is a subunit of the Integrator complex, which associates with the C-terminal domain of RNA polymerase II large subunit (POLR2A) and mediates 3-prime end processing of small nuclear RNAs U1 (RNU1) and U2 (RNU2)

Model organisms

Model organisms have been used in the study of INTS12 function. A conditional knockout mouse line, called Ints12tm1a(EUCOMM)Wtsi was generated as part of the International Knockout Mouse Consortium program — a high-throughput mutagenesis project to generate and distribute animal models of disease to interested scientists.

Male and female animals underwent a standardized phenotypic screen to determine the effects of deletion. Twenty seven tests were carried out on mutant mice and two significant abnormalities were observed.  No homozygous mutant embryos were identified during gestation, and therefore none survived until weaning. The remaining tests were carried out on heterozygous mutant adult mice; no additional significant abnormalities were observed in these animals.

References

Further reading 
 

Genes mutated in mice